George Pollard Jr. (1791–1870) was the captain of the whalers Essex and Two Brothers, both of which sank. Pollard's life, including his encounter with the sperm whale that sank Essex, served as inspiration for Captain Ahab, the whale-obsessed character in Herman Melville's Moby-Dick.

Life and work 

George Pollard was born in Nantucket, Massachusetts, the son of Tamar (Bunker) and George Pollard, a ship's captain, at a time when the principal industry there was hunting sperm whales to harvest the oil contained in their blubber and spermaceti. By the time he was 23 he had served on the Essex for four years in the capacities of second mate and first mate from 1815–1819.

In 1819, Pollard was appointed captain of Essex by the owners, Gideon Folger and Sons, and prepared to set sail for the Pacific Ocean in August. Other members of the 21-man crew included Owen Chase as first mate, Matthew Joy as second mate, and six other Nantucket men. Those included Pollard's seventeen-year-old cousin Owen Coffin with whose care and protection Pollard had been entrusted by his aunt, Nancy Bunker Coffin. To fill in the crew, others had to be recruited from Cape Cod and Boston; these were inexperienced seamen and were known as "green hands" by the Nantucketers.

Four days after leaving Nantucket the ship was struck by a sudden storm and suffered a knockdown, having been rolled almost ninety degrees onto her side. Two of the ship’s whaleboats were lost and another was damaged. This mishap was caused in part by miscalculations on the part of Pollard and his officers, and in part by the inexperience of the crew. Pollard declared the damage was so extensive that they should return to Nantucket for repairs, but Chase and Joy persuaded him to go forward to the Azores and hope to replace the whaleboats there.

After a difficult passage around Cape Horn, the Essex arrived in the Pacific Ocean in January 1820. With only three shipkeepers and the crew of Chase's whaleboat on board to repair their damaged vessel, the Essex began taking on water following the second collision with the whale. The crew abandoned the sinking vessel, taking the navigational equipment and Pollard's and Chase's sea chests with them. Meanwhile, Pollard and Joy were hunting smaller whales near the ship, and on their return found the Essex had capsized. The crew chopped off the masts (a necessary move that would enable the ship to stay upright for a longer time) and outfitted the whaleboats with sails and masts using the Essex's spars and sails. They also hastened to retrieve what provisions they could and divided them equally so that each whaleboat had 200 pounds of hardtack, 65 gallons of freshwater, and two Galapagos tortoises. The crew was divided into three whaleboats commanded by Pollard, Chase, and Joy and set sail with provisions estimated to last them 60 days. Pollard, Chase, and Joy set up a council to decide which direction to sail in. Pollard suggested sailing to the Society Islands, which were further away but presumed to be safer. However, on the grounds that very little was actually known about these islands, Chase and Joy disagreed, proposing instead to sail south far enough to pick up a band of variable breezes that would take them to South America. Once again, Captain Pollard reluctantly yielded to their arguments.

On 20 December, near starvation, the crews of the three whaleboats reached what they believed to be Ducie Island, but was actually Henderson Island. After seven days, they exhausted the island's meager supply of food and decided that the island could not sustain them and they reluctantly set sail again. Three of the men opted to remain on the island and were eventually rescued by the trading vessel Surry.

Sailing east towards South America, Pollard and Chase had seen Matthew Joy's health decline. He was transferred to Pollard's boat and shortly thereafter died. Obed Hendricks was given command of Joy's boat, and the three boats sailed on until during a gale one night Chase's boat became separated from the other two. By 20 January 1821 a crew member, Lawson Thomas, died just as the boats of Pollard and Hendricks had come to the end of their provisions. It was at this point that to survive their ordeal the men resorted to cannibalism. As other crew members died their bodies were eaten in turn until only four men were left alive on Pollard's boat. One of them, Charles Ramsdell proposed that lots should be drawn to determine who should be killed so that the rest might survive. Pollard at first resisted this suggestion but then gave in to the majority. The lot fell to his cousin Owen Coffin and lots were drawn again to determine who would be Coffin's executioner. Ramsdell drew the black spot and Coffin was shot and his remains eaten. After the death of Barzillai Ray some days later, Pollard and Ramsdell sailed on and were rescued on 23 February by the whaleship Dauphin and taken to Valparaíso. There they were reunited with the survivors of Chase's boat, Chase himself, Benjamin Lawrence and Thomas Nickerson, cabin boy of the Essex, who had been rescued by the British merchant ship Indian.

Upon his return to Nantucket on 5 August aboard the whaleship Two Brothers, Pollard had to face Nancy Bunker Coffin, who was distraught at the idea that Pollard was alive as a consequence of her son's death. Pollard was given command of the whaleship Two Brothers that had brought him home, and this voyage also ended in disaster when the ship ran into rocks off French Frigate Shoals and sank. This ended Pollard's whaling career. He made a single voyage in a merchant vessel and then spent the rest of his life as a night watchman on Nantucket.

Herman Melville is quoted by the Nantucket Historical Association as having said of Pollard, "To the islanders he was a nobody. To me, the most impressive man, tho' wholly unassuming, even humble – that I ever encountered."

In popular culture
First Mate Chase and a ghost writer wrote an account of the ordeal entitled Narrative of the Most Extraordinary and Distressing Shipwreck of the Whale-Ship Essex. This was published soon after the return of the survivors, and was an inspiration for the Herman Melville classic, Moby-Dick (1851). Much later, Cabin boy Nickerson wrote his own account of the voyage The Loss of the Ship Essex Sunk by a Whale and the Ordeal of the Crew in Open Boats. His manuscript was lost for nearly a century, but was discovered, authenticated and published in 1984. An account of the ordeal, using both Chase and Nickerson's works, was written by Nathaniel Philbrick in the 2000 non-fiction book, In the Heart of the Sea: The Tragedy of the Whaleship Essex.

The source material for Moby Dick found itself an inspiration for movie adaptations in the mid-2010s as two of them were released in quick succession, and in which George Pollard himself became portrayed.

In 2013, the television movie The Whale was broadcast on BBC One on 22 December, wherein an elderly Thomas Nickerson recounted the events of Essex. Pollard was played by Adam Rayner.

In 2015, a film, In The Heart of the Sea, directed by Academy Award Winner Ron Howard, was released on 11 December, and in which Pollard was portrayed by Benjamin Walker.

A dramatized documentary titled Revenge of the Whale, was produced and broadcast on 7 September 2001 by NBC. The Pollard character was voiced by actor Jordan Gelber.

References

Bibliography 

 
 Heffernan, Thomas Farel (1981) Stove by a whale: Owen Chase and the Essex, Middletown, CT: Wesleyan University Press; [New York: distributed by Columbia University Press].
 Heffernan, Thomas Farel (1990) Stove By A Whale: Owen Chase and the Essex. Middletown, CT: Wesleyan University Press. . 
 Nickerson, Thomas (1984) The Loss of the Ship Essex Sunk by a Whale and the Ordeal of the Crew in Open Boats. Nantucket: Nantucket Historical Association 
 

1791 births
1882 deaths
American people in whaling
Moby-Dick
Sea captains
People from Nantucket, Massachusetts
American sailors
History articles needing infoboxes